Bílinite (Fe2+Fe23+(SO4)·22H2O) is an iron sulfate mineral. It is a product of the oxidation of pyrite in water. It is an acidic mineral that has a pH of less than 3 and is harmful to the environment when it comes from acid rock drainage (Keith et al., 2001).

Bílinite was first discovered near Bílina, Czech Republic which is why the mineral was named 'bílinite' (Palache, et al., 1969). This mineral possibly occurs on Mars.

Composition
The weight percent oxide is as follows:

Related minerals
Related minerals to bílinite include jarosite, which is an iron sulfate salt, lepidocrocite, schwertmannite, ferricopiapite, and copiapite (Marion, et al., 2008).

Special characteristics
Boulder Creek is a stream at Iron Mountain in Shasta County, California. The stream drains into the Sacramento River and San Francisco Bay. The water in this stream is contaminated from the mixture of the groundwater and surface streams due to mining. The pH is low and acidic due to the oxidation of pyrite in water. This results in the formation of sulfuric acid and bílinite (Keith, et al., 2001).

References

Keith, David C., Runnells, Donald D., Esposito, Kenneth J., Chermak, John A., Levy, David B., Haaula, Steven R., Watts, Malcolm, Hall, Larry. (2001) Geochemical models of the impact of acidic groundwater and evaporative sulfate salts on Boulder Creek at Iron Mountain, California. Applied Geochemistry 16, 947-961.
Marion, Giles M., Kargel, Jeffrey S., Catling, David C. (2008) Modeling ferrous-ferric iron chemistry with application to Martian surface geochemistry. Geochimica Et cosmochimica Acta 72, 242-266.
Tosca, Nicholas J, McLennan Scott, M, (2009) Experimental constraints on the evaporation of partially oxidized acid-sulfate waters at the martian surface. Geochimica Et Cosmochmica Acta 73, 1205–1222.
Palache, C. H,. Berman, and C. Frondel, Bol'shakov, A.P. And L.I. Ptushko (1951) Fe2+ Fe23+ (SO4)4 *22(H2O). Handbook of Mineralogy. Mineral Data Publishing (Republish by the Mineralogical Society of America).

Sulfate minerals
Iron(II,III) minerals
Monoclinic minerals
Minerals in space group 14